Arene variabilis is a species of sea snail, a marine gastropod mollusc in the family Areneidae.

Description

The shell can grow to be 6 mm in length.

Distribution
This marine species occurs in the Caribbean Sea, the Gulf of Mexico and the Lesser Antilles.

References

 Rosenberg, G., F. Moretzsohn, and E. F. García. 2009. Gastropoda (Mollusca) of the Gulf of Mexico, pp. 579–699 in Felder, D.L. and D.K. Camp (eds.), Gulf of Mexico–Origins, Waters, and Biota. Biodiversity. Texas A&M Press, College Station, Texas.

Areneidae
Gastropods described in 1889